Multiphase may refer to 

 Multiphase flow, in fluid mechanics, the simultaneous flow of either a) materials with different states or phases or b) materials with different chemical properties but in the same state or phase
 Multiphase heat transfer
 Multiphase media in materials physics

See also